Azman is a surname and given name, and a Malay patronymic.

Notable people with this surname include:

Surname or patronymic 
 Ahmad Amsyar Azman (born 1992), Malaysian diver 
 Aifa Azman, Malaysian squash player 
 Ferhan Azman, Turkish architect
 Hadin Azman (born 1994), Malaysian footballer 
 Moshe Reuven Azman, Chief Rabbi of Ukraine
 Muhd Syukri Azman, Malaysian footballer 
 Yank Azman, Canadian actor

Given name
 Azman Adnan (born 1971), Malaysian footballer
 Azman Abdullah, Singaporean bodybuilder
 Azman Hashim, Malaysian financier
 Azman Ibrahim, Malaysian businessman
 Azman Ilham Noor, Bruneian footballer
 Azman Ismail, Malaysian politician
 Khairul Azman Mohamed, Malaysian footballer

Alias
 Azman, alias of convicted robber Abdul Rahman bin Arshad, who was one of the two robbers involved in Singapore's Oriental Hotel murder case in 1994.

Malaysian masculine given names